Chung Eui-sun (born 18 October 1970), also spelled Euisun Chung, is a South Korean billionaire businessman.  He is the chairman of Hyundai Motor Group and the only son and "heir apparent" of Hyundai Motor Group honorary chairman Chung Mong-koo.

Education 
Chung was educated in Whimoon High School and received a bachelor's degree in business management administration from Korea University in 1993. After graduation of Korea University, he earned an MBA from the University of San Francisco School of Business in 1997.

Career 
 2020–present: Chairman, Hyundai Motor Group
 2018–2020: Executive Vice Chairman, Hyundai Motor Group 
 2009–2018: Vice Chairman, Hyundai Motor Company 
 2005–2009: President, Kia Motors Corporation (sister company of Hyundai Motor) 
 2003–2005: Chief Operating Officer, Hyundai-Kia Corporate Planning Division 
 2001–2002: Deputy Operating Officer, Hyundai Motor's Domestic Sales & Marketing Division
 2001–2002: Deputy Operating Officer, Hyundai-Kia After-Sales Service Division 
 2000–2002: Deputy Operating Officer, Hyundai Information Technology Center
 1999–2001: Director, Hyundai Procurement Planning & Coordination Group
 1994–1999: Deputy Manager, Hyundai Precision and Industries Ltd. (San Francisco, US)
 1997–1999: Itochu Corporation (New York, US)

From 2005 to 2009, Chung was the president of Kia Motors Corp, a subsidiary of Hyundai Motor, which owns 34% of Kia. According to Forbes, Chung is credited with the success of the Kia Cee'd in Europe along with the Soul and the Forte.

In October 2020, Chung became chairman of Hyundai Motor Group, and his father, Chung Mong-Koo, honorary chairman.

Chung is World Archery Asia president.

Awards and honors 
 2006: World Economic Forum, Young Global Leader
 2005–present: Asian Archery Federation, President

Personal life
Chung is married, with two children, and lives in Seoul, South Korea.

Family

See also
Chaebol
List of Koreans

References

1970 births
Living people
South Korean businesspeople
University of San Francisco alumni
Hyundai Motor Group
Hyundai people
Chief operating officers
South Korean billionaires
Whimoon High School alumni
Korea University alumni